The 1991 Kano State gubernatorial election occurred on December 14, 1991. NRC candidate Kabiru Ibrahim Gaya won the election, defeating SDP Magaji Abdullahi.

Conduct
The gubernatorial election was conducted using an open ballot system. Primaries for the two parties to select their flag bearers were conducted on October 19, 1991.

References 

Kano State gubernatorial elections
Gubernatorial election 1991
Kan